Monte Clapier (French: Mont Clapier) is a mountain in the Maritime Alps, on the boundary between the province of Cuneo (Piedmont, northern Italy) and the French region of Provence-Alpes-Côte-d'Azur.

Geography 
It is part of the Mercantour massif.

Monte Clapier is home to the southernmost glacier in the Alps, located on the Italian side at some 40 km from the sea. Furthermore, it is the southernmost mountain in the Alps exceeding 3000 meters in height.

Geology 
Geologically, the mountain is formed by granitoid gneiss, with outcrops of amphibolic agmatites (granitoid migmatites).

Climbing 

It may be climbed from the Refuge Nice in around two-and-a-half to three hours, initially northward along a narrow path towards the Lacs de Mont Clapier, then eastward along a cairned route (no path visible) across rough, bouldered ground.

View 

The view is extensive stretching from the Mediterranean to the south to the high Alps to the northeast. Monte Viso is prominent to the north and 4000m peaks like the Matterhorn, Monte Rosa and the Weissmies, and even Corsica, are visible on clear days.

See also
Col de Clapier
Valle Gesso

References

Maps
 Italian official cartography (Istituto Geografico Militare - IGM); on-line version: www.pcn.minambiente.it
 French  official cartography (Institut Géographique National - IGN); on-line version:  www.geoportail.fr

Bibliography

Mountains of Piedmont
Mountains of Alpes-Maritimes
Mountains of the Alps
Alpine three-thousanders
France–Italy border
International mountains of Europe
Mountains partially in France